Tetracha rawlinsi is a species of tiger beetle that was described by Davidson and Naviaux in 2006 and is endemic to Nayarit, Mexico.

References

Cicindelidae
Beetles described in 2006
Endemic insects of Mexico
Insects of Mexico